Magati could refer to:

 Cesare Magati (1579-1647), Italian physician
 An alternative name for the language Persian Romani
 The Australian language Magati Ke
 A village at the base of the Usambara Mountains